Pandit Tulsi Ram Sharma (1943/44 – 16 November 2020) was an Indian politician who served as the speaker of Himachal Pradesh Legislative Assembly in India. He was elected as MLA from Bharmour constituency on ticket of Bharatiya Janata Party in 1990, 1998 and 2007. He was unanimously elected to the office of Speaker on 11 January 2008 to Dec. 2012.

Earlier Life

Pandit Tulsi Ram was basically from Bharmour and also priest of the 84 temples. Tulsi Ram's father Ram sh. Changga Ram was a carpenter. Tusli Ram started his journey from poor family. At the age of 18 he started job as a clerk before tehsildar office and after long period of service, 19 years 7 months, he quit his job and started his career in politics.

Personal  Interest

Interest of Pandit Tulsi Ram was in agriculture and horticulture. He made many reforms in the field of Agriculture and Horticulture. He introduced much modern equipment in the society which was imported from foreign countries.

Family

Tulsi Ram  was married to Late Sankutla Devi and Leela Devi and they have four children Harisaran Sharma, Sanjeev Kumar, Rakhi Sharma and Sushma Sharma.  He also has 6 grandchildren.

References

1944 births
2020 deaths
Speakers of the Himachal Pradesh Legislative Assembly
People from Chamba district
Himachal Pradesh MLAs 2007–2012
Bharatiya Janata Party politicians from Himachal Pradesh
Himachal Pradesh MLAs 1990–1992
Himachal Pradesh MLAs 1998–2003